The Agricultural Act of 1949 is a United States federal law (7 U.S.C. 1431) that is known as the "permanent legislation" of U.S. agricultural policy and is, in its amended form, still in effect.  The Act was enacted on October 31, 1949.  The purpose of the act is "To provide assistance to the States in the establishment, maintenance, operation, and expansion of school-lunch programs, and for other purposes."

Section 416(b)
Section 416 (b) of the 1949 Agriculture Act provides for the first time permanent legal basis by which surplus food can be donated to friendly overseas countries as development aid. This is a principal means, still in use today by which surplus food can be donated to friendly countries directly to the recipient national government or to an agreed NGO (PVO) or international body such as WFP to execute the program on behalf of USDA and the host government.

Donation of surplus commodities owned by the Commodity Credit Corporation (CCC) to  developing nations and friendly countries.  Donated food must not affect existing food programs or normal commercial sales.

CCC is the US government agency which purchases the surplus food from the market. Food can either be used directly or be monetized in the recipient country's market. Money gained from the sale can be then put to use on a pre-agreed program.

The type of surplus food can vary, but what is available will depend on the last year's harvest in the US.

Typical donations include these:

Wheat (varieties of wheat such as DRS, HRW, SWW, and a type of ready-to-eat mix of wheat-soy blend)
Corn, corn soy blend, instant corn soy milk, corn meal, etc.
Flour (all-purpose flour, bread flour, wheat flour etc.)
Milk powder, peas, beans and lentils
Rice
Soy bean
Tallow
Vegetable oil
Wood
Canned pink salmon (depending on season)

References

Further reading

External links
Text of Act from agriculture.senate.gov
Information about U.S. federal agricultural acts, from cornell.edu
Information from the USDA

1949 in law
1949 in the United States
United States federal agriculture legislation
81st United States Congress